Stanislav Vávra (born 20 July 1993 in Kroměříž) is a Czech football player who plays for 1. FK Příbram.

References
 Profile at FC Zbrojovka Brno official site
 

1993 births
Living people
Czech footballers
Czech expatriate footballers
Czech First League players
Czech National Football League players
2. Liga (Slovakia) players
FC Zbrojovka Brno players
FK Fotbal Třinec players
FC ŠTK 1914 Šamorín players
FK Baník Sokolov players
People from Kroměříž
Association football wingers
Czech expatriate sportspeople in Slovakia
Expatriate footballers in Slovakia
Sportspeople from the Zlín Region